, better known exclusively by his stage name , is a Japanese musician, media personality and entrepreneur. He is best known as the drummer of the rock band Luna Sea since 1989.

Career
While attending high school, Shinya and his friend Sugizo were members of the power metal band Pinoccio. They were then briefly both in Kashmir. When Shinya was asked to join Lunacy on January 16, 1989, he insisted that Sugizo also join. In 1991, the band changed their name to Luna Sea and released their first album. They went on to become very successful, having sold more than 10 million certified units in Japan, and are considered one of the most influential bands in the visual kei movement.

Shinya played drums for the track "Back Line Best" on his fellow Luna Sea bandmate J's 1997 debut solo album, Pyromania. Also in 1997, Shinya started a solo career where he was vocalist and drummer, his first release was the single "Rakkasuru Taiyou" released on September 26. The single "Hyôryûsha" followed on November 21, however, since the release of his first album No Sticks in December 1997, there hasn't been any material released by his solo career. After Luna Sea disbanded in 2000, Shinya worked as support drummer for musicians such as Miyavi, Nanase Aikawa, Maki Ohguro, Kyosuke Himuro, and numerous others. He also occasionally teaches drums to students at the Osaka School of Music.

Around 2005, he started the band Potbelly, with a younger singer named Milky. Although, they only released the single "Crash, Crash, Crash" on August 22, 2005. In 2006 he collaborated with Fake? (fellow Luna Sea member Inoran's band) for songs on their album Songs From Beelzebub. Also in 2006, he became a support drummer for Dead End front-man Morrie's project, Creature Creature, and teamed up with La'cryma Christi drummer Levin for several exhibitions in celebration of the 60th anniversary of Pearl Drums.

On December 24, 2007, Shinya reunited with Luna Sea to play a one-night only concert at the sold-out 55,000 seat Tokyo Dome. The band would reunite once again at the hide memorial summit on May 4, 2008. From 2008 to 2009, Shinya was support drummer for X Japan vocalist Toshi's project, Toshi with T-Earth. On August 31, 2010 he appeared with the other members of Luna Sea at a press conference in Hong Kong, where they officially announced their reunion and their 20th Anniversary World Tour Reboot -to the New Moon-.

In response to the 2011 Tōhoku earthquake and tsunami that occurred in Japan on March 11, Shinya supported Toshi at eight concerts throughout western Japan. All of the shows were acoustic due to the electricity shortage and also featured X Japan's Heath and the Orchestra Ensemble Kanazawa. All proceeds were donated to the Japanese Red Cross to aid the victims. In 2011 Shinya also joined Yellow Fried Chickenz, a band that also included Gackt and Chachamaru. However they disbanded after their July 4, 2012 concert, after only one year together.

Shinya participated in the HIV/AIDS benefit concert Hope and Live ~ HIV/AIDS Support and Treatment Benefit Concert 2013, which was held on August 26–28 at Club Citta and included many other artists such as Zigzo and his Luna Sea bandmate Ryuichi. He also contributed to the Dead End tribute album Dead End Tribute - Song of Lunatics -.

Having had to postpone most of their 2020 30th anniversary tour due to the COVID-19 pandemic in Japan, Luna Sea were set to perform at Saitama Super Arena on December 26 and 27, 2020. However, both were also postponed after Shinya tested positive for COVID-19 on the morning of December 26.

Personal life
Shinya grew up in a family with two older brothers, an older sister, and a younger step-brother from his father's second marriage. As a child he was trained in the traditional Japanese taiko drums, although cited Led Zeppelin's John Bonham as his favorite drummer. While known as a rockstar, he prefers to listen to Japanese pop music and enka, such as Ikuzo Yoshi and Saburō Kitajima.

Shinya married former Morning Musume member Aya Ishiguro in May 2000.

Discography
 , Oricon Singles Chart Peak Position: #15
  #19
 No Sticks (December 10, 1997), Oricon Albums Chart Peak Position: #74

VHS/DVD
 Melody (August 21, 1997)
 Shinya London Calling (February 1998)
 
 Shinya Jikiden Pro-Drummer no Kokoroe Best Price (October 27, 2011, re-release)

With Luna Sea

With Potbelly
 "Crash, Crash, Crash" (August 22, 2005)

With Yellow Fried Chickenz
 "The End of the Day" (September 14, 2011) #7
 "All My Love/You are the Reason" (December 28, 2011) #10
 Yellow Fried Chickenz I (March 14, 2012) #7
 World Tour *Show Your Soul. I* Yo Kai Kizu Ketsu Ai Tamashii Matsuri at Makuhari 2011 (April 18, 2012), Oricon DVDs Chart Peak Position: #7
 World Tour *Show Your Soul. I* Yo Kai Kizu Ketsu Ai Tamashii Matsuri at Berlin 2011 (April 18, 2012) #17

Other work
 Pyromania (J, July 24, 1997, drums on "Back Line Beast")
 Cozy Powell Forever (Various artists, September 19, 1998, drums on "Kill the King")
 Knockin' "T" Around (Takahiro Matsumoto, April 14, 1999, drums on "Go Further")
 Out of Jail (Toranoko Trash, May 23, 2002)
 R.U.O.K?! (Nanase Aikawa, November 9, 2005, drums)
 Songs From Beelzebub (Fake?, May 24, 2006)
 "Red" (Creature Creature, July 19, 2006, drums)
 "Paradise" (Creature Creature, July 19, 2006, drums)
 Light & Lust (Creature Creature, August 30, 2006, drums on "Red", "Hoshi Suki", "Paradise" and "Sen no Yamiyo ni")
 "Yakou/Crystal Rain" (LoveFixer, August 27, 2008)

 In Physical (Ken, April 22, 2009, drums on "My Angel" and "Save Me")
 "Hana" (Seven, September 9, 2009, drums on "Hana")
 Matsuribayashi (BuzzG featuring Gumi x Vocalists, June 29, 2011)
 Dead End Tribute - Song of Lunatics (Various artists, September 4, 2013, drums on "So Sweet So Lonely")
 "W.W.D II" (Dempagumi.inc, October 2, 2013, remixed the song for the limited edition)

References

External links
 Official website
 Official blog
 Official website of Shinya's restaurant
 Yellow Fried Chickenz official website

Luna Sea members
Visual kei musicians
Japanese rock drummers
Japanese male rock singers
People from Hadano, Kanagawa
Musicians from Kanagawa Prefecture
1970 births
Living people
21st-century drummers